16 Biggest Hits is a budget priced compilation album from country music artist Ricky Van Shelton. This is one of many similar compilations released by various record labels to capitalize on its catalogue and especially Ricky Van Shelton. This was his last overall album for Columbia Records. It was re-released on March 24, 2009.

Track listing

Release history

References

Ricky Van Shelton compilation albums
Shelton, Ricky Van
1999 greatest hits albums
Columbia Records compilation albums